Annouscka Brummelda Kordom (born 12 August 1997) is a Namibian footballer who plays as a forward for the Namibia women's national team. She was part of the team at the 2014 African Women's Championship. On club level she played for JS Academy in Namibia. She played college soccer for Corban University in the United States.

References

1997 births
Living people
Footballers from Windhoek
Namibian women's footballers
Women's association football forwards
Namibia women's international footballers
Corban University alumni
College women's soccer players in the United States
Namibian expatriate women's footballers
Namibian expatriates in the United States
Expatriate women's soccer players in the United States
Namibian men's footballers